Tatsyana Narelik (born 10 January 1983 in Gomel, Belarus) is a Belarusian rower. She competed in the women's quadruple sculls at the 2004 Summer Olympics.

References

Living people
Belarusian female rowers
Olympic rowers of Belarus
Rowers at the 2004 Summer Olympics
Sportspeople from Gomel
1983 births